Italo De Lorenzo is an Italian bobsledder who competed in the mid-1960s. He won a silver medal in the four-man event at the 1965 FIBT World Championships in St. Moritz.

De Lorenzo was a member of Italy's national bobsleigh team from 1959 to 1967, racing to gold in the 1964 two-man European Championships, and winning silver in the four-man World Championships in 1965.

He was a bobsleigh commentator for Dutch television and radio from 1968 to 1982,

and in 1978 he helped establish the Dutch bobsleigh and skeleton federation (Bob en Slee Bond Nederland / BSBN).

For many years de Lorenzo was a member of the BSBN executive committee and its team manager.

The Italian bobsledder is both honorary member and honorary president of the BSBN, and was voted Cavaliere al Merito della Repubblica Italiana in 2003 and Knight of the Order of Oranje-Nassau in 2011.

Italo de Lorenzo lives in Utrecht (NED) and Pieve de Cadore (ITA).

De Lorenzo today is an honorary president of the Dutch national bobsleigh and skeleton federation (BSBN).

References
Bobsleigh four-man world championship medalists since 1930
BSBN profile featuring de Lorenzo 

Italian male bobsledders
Living people
Year of birth missing (living people)